The Chairperson of the Karnataka Legislative Council is the presiding officer of the Karnataka Legislative Council, the main law-making body for the Indian state of Karnataka. The chairperson is elected by the members of the Karnataka Legislative Council (until 1973, the Mysore Legislative Council). The chairperson is usually a member of the Legislative Council.

List of the chairman's 
Mysore was renamed to Karnataka on 1 November 1973.

See also 

 List of deputy chairpersons of the Karnataka Legislative Council
Chief Ministers of Karnataka
 Karnataka Legislature

References

External links 

 Speaker's list on onlinebangalore.com

Karnataka Legislative Council
Karnataka politics-related lists